The M108 Howitzer is an American self-propelled 105 mm howitzer, first introduced in the early 1960s as a replacement for the M52 self-propelled howitzer.

The M108 was powered by a Detroit Diesel turbocharged 8V-71T 8-cylinders 405 hp engine. It used the same hull and turret as the 155 mm M109 self-propelled howitzer, and components of the M113 armored vehicle. The M108 was phased out soon after the American intervention in the Vietnam War, as the M109's 155 mm calibre was considered better fitted for modern war.

The M108 was used by several NATO countries.

Operational history 
The M108 howitzer's sole use in combat occurred in the Vietnam War. M108s equipped the first U.S. Army field artillery unit deployed to the conflict, when the 3-6 Field Artillery Battalion was deployed to Pleiku on June 17, 1966. This was soon followed by the 1-40th Field Artillery Battalion to Dong Ha Combat Base in October, 1966. M108s were generally employed from fortified fire bases providing artillery support to units in the field. Because M108 and M109 howitzers could traverse their main gun 360 degrees, unlike towed artillery, they were ideal for holding fire base positions, which might be subject to attack from any direction. Both M108 battalions were withdrawn and phased out of U.S. Army service in 1975.

General characteristics 
 Length: 6.11 m
 Width:  3.15 m
 Height: 3.28 m
 Weight: 21 t
 Speed: 56 km/h (35 mph)
 Range: 360 km
 Crew: 5
 Armament:
 Primary: M103 105 mm Howitzer
 Secondary: .50 caliber (12.7 mm) M2 machine gun
 Rate of fire: 4 rds/min
 Shooting range: 11.5 km (HE) 15 km (HERA)

Users

Current users

: Chilean Army 21 M108 VBCL (Véhicule Blindé de Commandement et Liaison) (Former Belgian Army).
: National Army of Uruguay 10 M108AP.

Former users

: Lent by US Army for Australian Defence Force during the Vietnam War.
: Belgian Army: 90, until the 1980s.
: Brazilian Army 72 M108AP, withdrawn, 10 donated to Uruguay.
: Khmer National Army: withdrawn
: Spanish Army: 48, withdrawn
: Republic of China Army: 100
: Turkish Army: 26 M108T withdrawn
: US Army withdrawn.
: Tunisian Army 48.

Comparable weapons
FV433 Abbot SPG - British 105mm SPG

See also
 List of U.S. military vehicles by model number
 List of U.S. military vehicles by supply catalog designation SNL G-296
 M7 Priest
 M37 105 mm Howitzer Motor Carriage

References

External links
Detailed data
Olive-Drab.com
Militaryfactory.com
Forecast International

Tracked self-propelled howitzers
Self-propelled howitzers of the United States
Cold War artillery of the United States
105 mm artillery
Military vehicles introduced in the 1960s